Francisco Antonio Lora Cabrera (1858 in Maizal, Santiago – 1971 in Bisonó (Navarrete)) popularly known as Ñico Lora was a folk musician from the Dominican Republic. He is considered one of the fathers of merengue.

Early life
His grandfather, Félix Lunnaux, was a soldier that came with Charles Leclerc’s expedition in 1802. Was great-uncle of Francisco Antonio Lora Ramirez.

When he was a child, he learned how to play the button accordion.

Career
Though he was not educated in music theory, he reached a high level of success for his endeavors. His most important songs were San Antonio, Tingo Talango, Eres La Mujer Más Bella, Pedrito Chávez and San Francisco. These songs still stand in time as an essential part of the musical roots of the Dominican people.

He was a great supplier of anonymous melodies that are kept like a cultural good of the Dominican nation.

Death and legacy
Ñico Lora died on  April 9, 1971 in the town of Bisonó (Navarrete), where there is a plaza called "La Plaza de la Cultura Ñico Lora" which was built in 1997 to honor his achievements and contributions to Dominican music. A statue in his memory was raised in Santiago in 2007.

Sources

Further reading 
 "Los cien músicos del siglo", (published in 2000 by "Cañabrava", in Santo Domingo and written by  "Antonio Gómez Sotolongo" ) in Spanish.
 Biografia de Ñico Lora

1858 births
1971 deaths
19th-century accordionists
20th-century accordionists
Dominican Republic musicians
Dominican Republic people of Spanish descent
Dominican Republic people of French descent
Merengue musicians
People from Santiago Province (Dominican Republic)